Kaliabor Lok Sabha constituency is one of the 14 Lok Sabha constituencies in Assam state in north-eastern India.

Assembly segments
Kaliabor Lok Sabha constituency is composed of the following assembly segments:

Members of Parliament

^ by poll

Election results

General elections 2019

General elections 2014

General elections 2009

See also
 Nagaon district
 List of Constituencies of the Lok Sabha

References

External links
Kaliabor lok sabha  constituency election 2019 date and schedule

Lok Sabha constituencies in Assam
Nagaon district